Spooners Patch is a British television sitcom, written by Ray Galton (best known for his writing collaborations with Alan Simpson, including Steptoe and Son) and Johnny Speight (best known for  Till Death Us Do Part). It ran for 3 series and 19 episodes and was made and broadcast from 1979 to 1982 on the ITV network, by ATV.

Plot
It is set in a police station in the fictional London suburb of Woodley. The title character of Spooner (Ronald Fraser, then Donald Churchill) is the inspector in charge who is engaged in various corrupt ventures and lives above the station. The other main characters are the officers who work under him,  including a detective played by Peter Cleall who thinks he is from Starsky & Hutch and drives around in a Ford Anglia in the same red and white colour scheme as their Ford Torino. Patricia Hayes appeared in the second two series as a traffic warden.

Cast list
 Ronald Fraser - Inspector Spooner
 Donald Churchill - Inspector Spooner (1980 -1982)
 Peter Cleall - Detective Constable Bolsover
 John Lyons - PC Killick
 Patricia Hayes - Mrs Cantaford
 Norman Rossington - PC Goatman
 Dermot Kelly - Kelly
Lynn Farleigh - Mrs Webster
John Clegg - Vicar
Donald Morley - Mayor 
Ronnie Brody - Man in Police station 
Roy Barraclough - Landlord 
Amanda Barrie - Spooners Girlfriend  
Ballard Berkeley - Bank Manager  
Barrie Rutter - The Psychiatrist  
Harry Fowler - Jimmy the con 
Reginald Marsh - Senior Police Officer  
James Villiers - Film Producer  
Jonathan Cecil - Captain Jim 
Wendy Richard - Girl 
Stuart Saunders - Golf Club Secretary  
Bob Bryan - Mr. Webster 
Mary Conlon - Bulsover’s Girlfriend  
Chris Cunningham - Dutch Sailor 
Jack Douglas - Man in Car 
Frank Coda - Jimmy’s Friend 
Jeffrey Segal - Bank Manager  
Lee Whitlock - Boy 
John Barron - The Golf Club President  
Willy Bowman - Dutch Sailor 
Sarah Carthy - Killick’s Girlfriend  
Anthony Sharp - The Doctor 
Ruby Buchanan - Old Lady 
John Louis Mansi - Waiter 
Ava Cadell - Greta - Au Pair Girl  
Mavis Pugh - Woman 
Terry Gurry - Dutch Sailor 
Bill Treacher - Car owner  
Debbie Linden - Film Girl  
Bella Emberg - The Mayor’s Wife 
Richard Fraser - TV Reporter 
Richard Sheekey - Dutch Sailor 
Stan Van - 2nd Waiter 
Billy Gray - Postman 
Richard Speight - Clapper Boy

References

External links

ITV sitcoms
1979 British television series debuts
1982 British television series endings
English-language television shows
Television shows produced by Associated Television (ATV)
Television series created by Ray Galton
1970s British sitcoms
1970s British workplace comedy television series
1980s British sitcoms
1980s British workplace comedy television series